Karl Skytte (31 March 1908 – 9 June 1986), was a Danish politician and party leader. He served as member of Folketinget for the Danish Social Liberal Party from 1947 to 1978 and as the party's leader from 1960 to 1968. He was a farmer by profession. As Minister for Agriculture from 1957 to 1964, he had only limited success in resisting the pressure for structural development of the sector resulting in the abandonment of many small farms. Back then small farmers constituted an important part of the Social Liberal electorate. As party leader from 1960, Skytte was eventually sidelined by Hilmar Baunsgaard who had a much stronger TV appeal. When the latter formed his cabinet in 1968, Skytte became Speaker of the Folketing. He retired from politics in 1978.

References  

1908 births
1986 deaths
People from Assens Municipality
Danish Social Liberal Party politicians
Agriculture ministers of Denmark
Speakers of the Folketing
Leaders of the Danish Social Liberal Party